Alexis Pierre Caron (8 March 1899 – 31 August 1966) was a Canadian politician. Caron was a Liberal Party member of the House of Commons of Canada. He was born in Hull, Quebec and became an insurance broker by career.

He was first elected to the Legislative Assembly of Quebec at the Hull provincial riding in 1935 for the Quebec Liberal Party, then defeated in 1936, returned in 1939, defeated again in 1944 and 1948.

Caron was mayor of Hull, Quebec from April 1953 to April 1955. During this time, he entered national politics by winning the Hull riding in the 1953 federal election. He was then re-elected there in the 1957, 1958, 1962, 1963 and 1965 federal elections. Caron ended his Parliamentary career in 1966 shortly before his death during his term in the 27th Canadian Parliament.

Caron was Liberal party whip in 1963.

References
 
 

1899 births
1966 deaths
Members of the House of Commons of Canada from Quebec
Liberal Party of Canada MPs
Mayors of Hull, Quebec
Quebec Liberal Party MNAs